Janina Danuta Poremska (born 13 May 1948) is a former Polish pair skater. With skating partner Piotr Szczypa, she is a six-time Polish national champion, and competed at the 1968 Winter Olympics.

Results 
(with Szczypa)

References 

1948 births
Polish female pair skaters
Olympic figure skaters of Poland
Living people
People from Siemianowice Śląskie
Figure skaters at the 1968 Winter Olympics
Sportspeople from Silesian Voivodeship